The South Yuba Canal Office was the headquarters for the largest network of water flumes and ditches in California.  It is located at 134 Main Street, Nevada City, California, USA.

Structure
Built in 1855, it was originally known as the Potter Building.  A two story brick structure, it was fitted with iron doors and shutters, plus a filigree balcony railing. 

The space was first used as a drug store. From 1857 to 1880, it functioned as the South Yuba Canal Office. The Nevada City Chamber of Commerce is the building's current occupant. It is the oldest business building in Nevada City.

South Yuba Canal Water Company
The South Yuba Canal Water Company that was run from this office was the first incorporated to supply water for hydraulic mining. Originally named in 1854 as the Rock Creek, Deer Creek, and South Yuba Canal Company  as a consolidation of three rival ditch companies, the name was shortened in 1870 to the South Yuba Canal Company. Charles Marsh was the chief engineer and, it seems, one of the principals of the Rock Creek, Deer Creek, and South Yuba Canal Company (and was known as the "Father of Ditches").  The company built and operated flumes, reservoirs, and water ditches that carried water to connecting water systems that supplied hundreds of hydraulic mines in the area. In 1882, the company built a dam at Lake Fordyce to trap snowmelt and runoff for release in the dry season. The company later entered the utility business, and in 1905, its holdings went on to become a part of the Pacific Gas and Electric Company's hydroelectric system.

South Yuba Canal
The company's original ditch was put into use in 1850. The South Yuba Canal is now part of the public lands of the Tahoe National Forest. The South Yuba Canal System is used for delivering domestic and agricultural water to Nevada City and its neighbor Grass Valley. The water also generates electricity in Northern California. Crossing private and National Forest lands, the canal is bordered by conifers and hardwoods.

California Historical Landmark
The building is honored as the California Historical Landmark No. 832.   The plaque's inscription reads:
SOUTH YUBA CANAL OFFICE
Headquarters for the largest network of water flumes and ditches in the state. The South Yuba Canal Water Company was the first incorporated to supply water for hydraulic mining. The original ditch was in use in May 1850, and this company office was in use from 1857 to 1880. The holdings later became part of the vast PG&E hydroelectric system...California Registered Historical Landmark No. 832..Plaque placed by the State Department of Parks and Recreation in cooperation with the Nevada County Historical Landmarks Commission and the California Heritage Council, May 16, 1970.

See also

California Historical Landmarks in Nevada County

References

External links
 Photo

Commercial buildings completed in 1855
California Historical Landmarks
Buildings and structures in Nevada City, California
California Gold Rush